Alexander Zakrzewski is an American television director and cinematographer. He has directed episodes of Cold Case, Law & Order: Criminal Intent, Law & Order: Special Victims Unit, Numb3rs and The Wire, as well as worked on several Tom Fontana produced shows including Homicide: Life on the Street, Oz and The Jury.  Prior to his episodic work, he shot documentaries for independent film makers and the US Networks including several for Harpo Productions, where he developed a reputation for fluid hand held work.

For The Wire Zakrzewski directed Season 3, Episode 9, "Slapstick", in 2004. He returned in 2006 to direct the ninth episode of the fourth season, "Know Your Place". Show runner David Simon, who first worked with Zakrzewski on Homicide: Life On the Street, praised Zakrzewski's work on The Wires restaurant scene between Howard "Bunny" Colvin and his students in the episode.

Filmography

Director

Cinematographer
Crime & Punishment (2002)
The Beat (2000)
Homicide: Life on the Street (1995–1999)
Oz (1997)

References

External links
 

American cinematographers
American television directors
Living people
Place of birth missing (living people)
Year of birth missing (living people)